{{Infobox university
 | name                   = Army War College
 | image_name             = 
 | image_size             = 
 | motto                  =  (Sanskrit)
 | motto_lang             = Sanskrit
 | mottoeng               = Enter into Battle with Resolve
 | established            = 1 April 1971
 | type                   = Defence Service Training InstituteWar college
 | Carnegie Class         = 
 | head_label             = Commandant
 | head                   = Lieutenant General Devendra Pratap Pandey UYSM, AVSM, VSM
 | deputy head            = 
 | city                   = Mhow (Dr. Ambedkar Nagar)
 | District               = 
 | state                  = Madhya Pradesh
 | country                = India
 | undergrad              = 
 | postgrad               = 1,300
 | staff                  = 
 | affiliations           = Devi Ahilya Vishwavidyalaya, Indore
 | campus                 = 
 | mascot                 = 
 | free_label             = 
 | free                   = 
 | colors                 = 
 | website                = 
}}
The Army War College, Mhow (A.W.C.) is a defence service training and research institution of the Indian Army located in Mhow, Madhya Pradesh. It is a leading seat of warfare and carries out research in tactics, logistics, contemporary military studies and improvement in military doctrine. The college trains about 1,200 officers of the Indian Armed Forces, as well as paramilitary forces each year.

The college is led by the Commandant, a three-star officer from the Indian Army. The present Commandant is Lieutenant General DP Pandey UYSM, AVSM, VSM.

History
The college was originally established as the College of Combat' at Mhow on 1 April 1971. It was spun out of the Infantry School, Mhow. It continued to operate from the campus of the Infantry School until 1988, when the college moved to its new campus. In 2003, the college was renamed as the Army War College, Mhow''.

Training
A.W.C. develops doctrines and trains Army personnel for operations in existing environments to which the Indian Army forces are typically deployed, keeping in mind the modern technology and systems they encounter. A.W.C. aims to train forces for synchronised operation with other services of the armed forces.

It develops and validates new operational and logistic concepts through conceptual studies, war games, discussions and seminars.

The courses offered at A.W.C. include the Higher Command Course, the Senior Command Course, the Junior Command Course and the Defence Management Course. The Higher Command course (HCC) is a part of a Master of Philosophy programme in Defence Management, affiliated with the Devi Ahilya Vishwavidyalaya (also known as Indore University). The HCC is aimed at officers of the rank of Colonel, Captain and Group Captain who have completed their command tenure.

About 1,200 officers of the Indian Army and Indian paramilitary forces undergo training at A.W.C. each year. In addition, about 100 officers of foreign armies also go through A.W.C. courses annually.

See also
 Naval War College, Goa
 College of Air Warfare
 Indian National Defence University
 Military Academies in India

References

http://www.uniindia.com/news/india/army-war-college-celebrates-golden-jubilee/2360072.html

Military academies of India
Military education and training in India
Education in Mhow
Universities and colleges in Mhow
1971 establishments in Madhya Pradesh
Educational institutions established in 1971